Thaumaina is a genus of butterflies in the family Lycaenidae. It is monotypic, containing the single species Thaumaina uranothauma.

References

External links
"Thaumaina Bethune-Baker, 1908" at Markku Savela's Lepidoptera and Some Other Life Forms

Polyommatini
Monotypic butterfly genera
Taxa named by George Thomas Bethune-Baker
Lycaenidae genera